Mysteries and Scandals (also known as Mysteries & Scandals) is an American television program hosted by A.J. Benza. The series was originally broadcast on the E! network from March 1998 until February 2001.

Synopsis
The series detailed the lives of various celebrities, both well known and somewhat obscure. Most celebrities that were featured endured hardships or died untimely deaths. The series interviewed various celebrities who knew the subject along with still photographs accompanied by narrations, and dramatic reenactments.

The show was highly stylized and presented each episode in a noir fashion with backdrops set in various Hollywood locations and narrated in a hard-boiled, often sarcastic fashion by Benza. One of Benza's memorable catchphrases, "Fame, ain't it a bitch?," would later become the title of his autobiography.

The series aired for three seasons. Episodes were repeated on E! for a period of time after the series' initial run.

See also
List of Mysteries and Scandals episodes

References

External links
 
 

1998 American television series debuts
2001 American television series endings
E! original programming
English-language television shows
Entertainment news shows in the United States